Seyyed Hashem Aghajari  (born 1957) is an Iranian historian, university professor and a critic of the Islamic Republic's government who was sentenced to death in 2002 for apostasy for a speech he gave on Islam urging Iranians to "not blindly follow" Islamic clerics. In 2004, after domestic Iranian and international outcry, his sentence was reduced to five years in prison.

Overview
Hashem Aghajari served in the Iran-Iraq War where he lost his right leg below the knee, and his brother. He has been described as having an "impeccable Islamic revolutionary record."

He was a history professor at Tarbiat Modares University, a teacher-training college in Tehran. In June 2002, Aghajari gave an address in Hamadan commemorating the 25th anniversary of the death of Dr. Ali Shariati, criticized some of the present Islamic practices in Iran as being in contradiction with the original practices and ideology of Islam, and calling for "Islamic Protestantism" and reform in Islam. This prompted an "immediate outcry" from hard-line clerics, who claimed that he was attacking "the Prophet of Islam and fundamental Shiite Islamic traditions", although Dr. Aghajari has repeatedly denied that his speech was intended as an attack on Islam or the Prophet.

Arrest, trial, sentence and imprisonment
He was arrested 8 August. The trial was criticized not only for its harshness but for falling "far short of international standards of due process," being "conducted behind closed doors", and giving the defendant "only limited access to his lawyer." According to the conservative newspaper Jumhuri Eslami, the Supreme Leader's order was (at first) "flagrantly" ignored by prosecutor general Abdolnabi Namazi. According to The Economist magazine, Supreme leader Khamenei ordered the judiciary to review Aghajari's death sentence, but "hardliners in the judiciary at first ignored" his order "then assigned their least lenient judges to the review."

Although other controversial death sentences have been reduced on appeal, Aghajari refused to appeal the ruling, announcing through his lawyer that "those who have issued this verdict have to implement it if they think it is right or else the judiciary has to handle it." While in prison his family reported that Aghajari's amputated leg stub was bruised and infected and that he was "unable to stand up, walk or use the prison's hygiene facilities." The human rights group, Amnesty International, campaigned against the sentence.

The death sentence was denounced by many. The Iranian parliament, President Mohammad Khatami, and Grand Ayatollah Hossein-Ali Montazeri condemned it.

Demonstrations against the sentence began the day after it was made public on November 6. They are thought to have attracted no more than 5000 participants but nonetheless were "the most serious protests in Iran since 1999" and are thought to have provoked Supreme Leader Ali Khamenei to order a review of the verdict and a threat to use "popular forces" (basij) against the demonstrators.

The sentence was later commuted to three years in jail, two years in probation, and five years' suspension of his social rights by the Supreme Court of Iran. In May 2004 the original regional court reinstated the death sentence, but the next month Iran's Supreme Court again reduced it.

He was released from prison July 31, 2004 after paying a bail of $122,500, according to the Associated Press.

Explanation
According to Mashallah Shamsolvaezin, a "leading Iranian newspaper editor and confidant of Iranian President Mohammad Khatami" interviewed by Newsweek magazine, the arrest and stiff sentence were an attempt to distract attention from two bills to increase the power of president and curb the hard-liner conservatives' supervisory power which reformist President Khatami had introduced into Parliament.

The failure of Iran's Hezbollah paramilitaries to make "a serious attempt to break up" the peaceful reformist student protests over the sentence was thought to be associated with Supreme Leader Khamenei's implicit criticism of the sentence and the "impartiality" of his failing to side with conservative hardliners.

Publications
 The Role Of The Policies Of The Successors Of The Malikshah In The Political Instability Of The Seljuk State, 2018 (Co-author)
 The challenge of carpet job-shop in the Qajar period with developments affected by the Industrial Revolution,  Journal of Iranian Islamic Period History 2021. (Co-author)
 The Influence of Nader Shah's Militarism Policies on the Iranian Foreign Trade, Journal of Iranian Islamic Period History 2018. (Co-author)

Awards and honors 
 Jan Karski Award for Moral Courage (2003)

See also 
 Human rights in Islamic Republic of Iran
 Chained Murders of Iran

References

External links
  BBC Persian article on Aghajari's new sentence
 Text of offending June 2002 speech
 Hashem Aghajari - European Parliament
 hrw.org, November 2002, Iran: Academic’s Death Sentence Condemned
 Hashem Aghajari at nawaat.org
 Hashem Aghari- Digital Library
 Hashem Aghajari's profile at Modares University
Hashem Aghajari case at Amnesty International
 Hashem Aghari's list of other publications

Iranian essayists
Iranian writers
Living people
1957 births
Mojahedin of the Islamic Revolution of Iran Organization politicians
Academic staff of Tarbiat Modares University
Prisoners sentenced to death by Iran
Iranian prisoners sentenced to death
People charged with apostasy in Iran
Members of the National Council for Peace